The Balkan Hockey League, called the BaHL, is the second highest-level ice hockey league in Bulgaria.

History

The idea for the league was caused by Martin Milanov, famous Bulgarian professional ice hockey player and future president of BaHL. In the beginning only a few teams participated but over the time more and more teams joined, making 10 teams nowadays.

The league exists in today's form since the 2006-07 season.

During the years teams from Serbia, Greece, Macedonia have joined and have left the league. This season there are only two foreign teams: Metalurg Skopje (Macedonia) and Allstars (Greece).

Teams

BaHL Playoffs
There are playoffs after the regular seasons. Almost all BaHL have been won by Bulgarian teams. The only cases in which the championship was won by other teams, they were from Greece.

BaHL Champions 

 2007 PAOK
 2008 Slavia Sofia
 2009 Aris Thessaloniki
 2010 Etro (Veliko Tarnovo)
 2011 NSA (Sofia)
 2012 NSA (Sofia)
 2013 Dynamo Sofia
 2014 

bold - seasons in which league had teams outside Bulgaria.

See also
 Bulgaria men's national ice hockey team
 Bulgarian Hockey League, 1st league in Bulgaria
 Ice hockey in Bulgaria

References

External links
BaHL Official Facebook Page

2
Balkan
Bul